The Walkman E Series is a line of digital audio (DAP) and portable media (PMP) players, marketed by Sony as part of its Walkman range. E Series devices have been marketed since 2000, although in its current form since 2008 as entry-level, candybar styled players.

History

2000–2004

The E series started in 2000 as the second memory based Walkman music player after the Memory Stick based NW-MS7. The first generation players came with 96 MB (NW-E5), 64 MB (NW-E3) or 32 MB (NW-E2) embedded flash memory. The player looked like a cigarette lighter and was deemed "ultra compact and light", weighing 45 grams. The NW-E3 was released in Japan on June 10, 2000 as the very first "Network Walkman", and from 2001 elsewhere. The larger capacity NW-E5 was released in Japan in December 2000. These players continue the use of OpenMG software like the Memory Stick Walkman.

The second generation NW-E7 and NW-E10 models were announced in September 2001 and first released in Japan in October 2001. The NW-E10 has 128 MB memory, with cited storage for 240 minutes of ATRAC playback. It was the earliest Network Walkman to support the MP3 format.

In 2004 models NW-E75 (256 MB) and NW-E55 (128 MB) were released. These have an acrylic finish and come in either silver (NW-E75) or either blue, red or pearl (NW-E55). These players don't support MP3.

The NW-E99 and NW-E95 were introduced in October 2004, with 1 GB and 512 MB internal memory respectively. They had native MP3 support.

2005–2008
The NW-E100 series, also marketed as the Walkman Circ, was released in March 2005 which has a circular design. The player comes in 1 GB (NW-E107), 512 MB (NW-E105) and 256 MB (NW-E103) capacities and was available in several colors. Rated battery life was up to 70 hours playback. It was designed to take on Apple's iPod Shuffle.

E500/E400 Series

Shortly afterwards the NW-E500 and NW-E400 series were introduced, also marketed as the Walkman Core,  with capacities ranging from 256 MB to 1 GB. These are USB thumb drive styled with an electroluminescence display. The two are the same except that NW-E500 has an FM radio tuner. Sony said these were modeled after glass perfume bottles. These feature a multifunctional knob controller (the trademarked "Jog Dial") used for navigating similar to some of the earlier E Series and MiniDisc Walkman. The dial has three states: HOLD, song mode, and music grouping. Sony also claimed it has a "superquick battery charge" giving 3 hours of battery life by charging for 3 minutes. This feature was carried over to various other Walkman players afterwards.

E300/E200 Series
The NW-E300/E200 series, nicknamed and also marketed as the Walkman Bean, was released in October 2005, and production ceased in April 2006. The name refers to its shape, which was modelled after a jellybean. The Walkman Bean featured a 'pop-out' USB port for file transfer. One of its major selling points was the battery's fast charge speed, with Sony stating that a 3-minute charge would give 3 hours of playback. Sony claimed that a fully charged Bean playing Sony's own compressed audio format, ATRAC, can operate for 50 hours, or 40 hours for audio compressed as MP3.

The player was available in three versions: the basic model with 512MB capacity (model NW-E205), the basic model with an inbuilt FM radio (model NW-E305), and a higher-capacity 1GB model (model NW-E307). It was also available in four colours, named after jellybean flavours -  Tropical Ice (blue), Cotton Candy (pink), Licorice (black) and Coconut (white). The Bean didn't last long with low sales accompanied with poor ergonomics.

E000 Series
In August 2006 Sony released the NW-E000 series, filled with 512MB, 1 GB or 2 GB of flash-memory. Very compact, this Walkman offered a battery life of up to 28 hours. It had a built-in USB key for easy file transfer. The battery charge/recharge was through USB connection. It was also equipped with a 1 line OLED display for navigation. It no longer has a dial but instead has normal buttons.

Supported multiple codec ATRAC (ATRAC3 66 kbit/s, 105 kbit/s, 132 kbit/s, ATRAC3plus 48 kbit/s, 64 kbit/s, 256 kbit/s) MP3 and WMA (and later AAC), via SonicStage 3.4 software for music management and transfers of tracks. This series also worked with Linux and Mac using the free software originally called NW-E00X MP3 File Manager, that eventually become in Symphonic, and now JSymphonic. JSymphonic is an open source, cross-platform program (that runs on any Windows/Linux/Mac machine with java 1.5 installed), that, once copied into the Walkman enables the transfer of several audio files, including MP3, to/from several flash based Walkman Series. It can be downloaded from here and is in continuous development.

E010 Series

In March 2007, Asia, Australia, New Zealand, some countries of Europe and Canada had the Walkman NW-E010 series (NW-E013, NW-E015 and NW-E016) a small USB flash player. Weighing only 23 g, the NW-E010 was available in capacities from 1 to 4 GB and came in five colors: pink, violet, teal, black, and gold. Its features included a rechargeable lithium-ion battery, built-in FM tuner, a three-line color OLED display, calendar and time function, and Clear Stereo and Clear Bass technologies to enhance the audio quality.

E020 Series

The NW-E020 series were released in Japan in March 2008. The memory sizes were 1 GB for the NW-E023, 2 GB for the NW-E025, and 4 GB for the NW-E026. Each size was available in a five color assortment: white, pink, green, red, and black. The faces of the players were designed for admit changeable color and design templates. The supplied earbuds were the MDR-EX82 earphones in white for the white, pink, and green player and black for the red and black player.

These could play ATRAC, PCM, WMA, MP3, and AAC, (DRM'ed WMA and AAC couldn't be played). As in older models the connector, was the standard male USB. The screen was LCD and displayed three lines along with an optional album-jacket function. It had a five-band equalizer and Sony's "clear stereo" which means pre-set EQ function. They had a built-in Li-Ion cell which had a quick-charge for approximately three hours playback from a 3-minute plug-in and a complete charge takes about one hour. Sony mentioned the capability of FM reception, (Japan band of 76 to 90 MHz), usually devices with an F at the end of the model number.

2008–present

In 2008 the previously "gumstick" style E Series was repurposed into a new line of entry-level, slim and colorful portable media players ("gumstick" style E Series players briefly continued in Japan, and internationally as the B Series). The E430 Series was launched in 2008 with a 2-inch colour display and video playing capabilities. Its 2009 successor, the E440 series, featured a 2-inch QVGA color display and was 9.3mm thick. From this point on, cheaper variants would be made under the E3xx range, starting with the E340 series, which remove a few features from the E4xx range of players and have USB ports instead of proprietary WM-PORT.

Its successor, E450 series, was introduced in July 2010. This player was the first featuring Karaoke Mode, a new function that reduces lead vocals in a song. It also featured (for the first time on a Walkman outside Japan) scrolling lyrics using an LRC file. The player came in black, red, blue, pink or green. A smaller sized, low cost E Series player without video capability, the E050, was released in Japan in 2010 and in 2011 in Singapore, Mexico and Eastern Europe.

This was followed by E460 in 2011 with a 50 hour battery life (same as E450 series). The E470 was introduced in 2012 and for the first time featured games - it comes preloaded with Puyo Pop Fever and Number Place (sudoku). In 2013 the E580 series was launched which adds support for lossless FLAC audio. By now the product range had split entirely into the E3xx and E5xx range, and starting with the E360 series the E3xx range became more distinct, adopting a reduced size and the pre-2010 user interface.

The latest entry, the NW-E390 series, was released in 2016, with a new rectangle design over the E380 series. It comes in variants of 16 GB (E395), 8 GB (E394) and 4 GB (E393).

Specifications and comparison
Base models are the E4xx range. The E3xx range removes some features from E4xx equivalents. The E5xx range adds some features from the E4xx equivalents.

See also
Sony Walkman
List of Sony Walkman products

References

Sony products
Digital audio players
Portable media players